Members of the New South Wales Legislative Assembly who served in the 43rd parliament held their seats from 1971 to 1973. They were elected at the 1971 state election, and at by-elections. The Speaker was Sir Kevin Ellis.

See also
Fourth Askin ministry
Fifth Askin ministry
Results of the 1971 New South Wales state election (Legislative Assembly)
Candidates of the 1971 New South Wales state election

References

Members of New South Wales parliaments by term
20th-century Australian politicians